Codeine/paracetamol, also known as codeine/acetaminophen and co-codamol, is a compound analgesic consisting of a combination of codeine phosphate and paracetamol (acetaminophen). Codeine/paracetamol is used for the relief of mild to moderate pain when paracetamol or non-steroidal anti-inflammatory drug (NSAIDs) such as ibuprofen, aspirin or naproxen alone do not sufficiently relieve symptoms.

In 2020, it was the 187th most commonly prescribed medication in the United States, with more than 2million prescriptions.

Side effects
The most common side effects of co-codamol are constipation and feeling sick (nausea) or sleepy.
Other side effects may include blood from mouth, skin rashes, dizziness, sedation, shortness of breath, hypersensitivity reaction, fainting (syncope or near syncope), confusion, loss of short-term memory, changes in blood, allergic reactions, euphoria, dysphoria, abdominal pain, itchiness, easy bruising, bleeding gums, vivid dreams, dry mouth and addiction.

Genetic differences between people give rise to differing rates of metabolism of codeine to morphine. In about 5% of people this may happen particularly fast, leading to higher levels of morphine being passed through breast milk in amounts potentially able to cause fatal respiratory depression of a breastfed baby.

Society and culture

Availability 
Of the European Union (EU) member states, 12 countries (Bulgaria, Cyprus, Denmark, Estonia, France, Ireland, Latvia, Lithuania, Malta, Poland, Romania, Slovenia) allow the sale of OTC codeine solid dosage forms.

References

External links 
 

Combination analgesics
Hepatotoxins
Opiates